Sheyda Rural District is in Sheyda District of Ben County, Chaharmahal and Bakhtiari province, Iran. At the censuses of 2006 and 2011, its constituent villages were in Zayandeh Rud-e Jonubi Rural District of the former Ben District in Shahrekord County, and before the rural district became a part of Ben County. At the most recent census of 2016, the population of the rural district was 3,541 in 1,130 households, by which time it was in the Sheyda District of the recently established Ben County. The largest of its three villages was Yan Cheshmeh, with 2,190 people.

References 

Ben County

Rural Districts of Chaharmahal and Bakhtiari Province

Populated places in Chaharmahal and Bakhtiari Province

Populated places in Ben County

fa:دهستان شیدا